Orajõgi is a river in Põlva County, Estonia. The river is 48 km long and basin size is 181.1  km2. It runs into Ahja River.

References

Rivers of Estonia
Põlva County